The Liancourt Rocks, also known by their Korean name of Dokdo or their Japanese name of Takeshima, form a group of islets in the Sea of Japan between the Korean peninsula and the Japanese archipelago. The Liancourt Rocks lie in rich fishing grounds that may contain large deposits of natural gas.

While South Korea controls the islets, its sovereignty over them is contested by Japan. North Korea also claims the territory. South Korea classifies the islets as Dokdo-ri, Ulleung-eup, Ulleung County, North Gyeongsang Province, while Japan classifies the islands as part of Okinoshima, Oki District, Shimane Prefecture.

Geography
The Liancourt Rocks consist of two main islets and numerous surrounding rocks. The Western Island is the larger of the two, with a wider base and higher peak, while the Eastern Island offers more usable surface area.

Altogether, there are about 90 islets and reefs, volcanic rocks formed in the Cenozoic era, more specifically 4.6 to 2.5 million years ago. A total of 37 of these islets are recognized as permanent land.

The western islet consists of a single peak and features many caves along the coastline. There are two large caves giving access to the sea, as well as a crater.

In 2006, a geologist reported that the islets formed 4.5 million years ago and are (in a geological sense) quickly eroding.

Visiting 

Restricted public access to the rocks for a variety of purposes is provided by ferry from Ulleng Island.

Distances

Climate

Owing to their location and small size, the Liancourt Rocks can have harsh weather. If the swell is greater than 3 to 5 metres, then landing is not possible, so on average ferries can only dock about once in forty days. Overall, the climate is warm and humid, and heavily influenced by warm sea currents. Precipitation is high throughout the year (annual average—), with occasional snowfall. Fog is common. In summer, southerly winds dominate.

Ecology

The islets are volcanic rocks, with only a thin layer of soil and moss. About 49 plant species, 107 bird species, and 93 insect species have been found to inhabit the islets, in addition to local marine life with 160 algal and 368 invertebrate species identified. Although between 1,100 and 1,200 litres of fresh water flow daily, desalinization plants have been installed on the islets for human consumption because existing spring water suffers from guano contamination. Since the early 1970s trees and some types of flowers were planted.  According to historical records, there used to be trees indigenous to Liancourt Rocks, which have supposedly been wiped out by overharvesting and fires caused by bombing drills over the islets. A recent investigation, however, identified ten spindle trees aged 100–120 years. Cetaceans such as Minke whales, orcas, and dolphins are known to migrate through these areas.

Pollution and environmental destruction

Records of the human impact on the Liancourt Rocks before the late 20th century are scarce, although both Japanese and Koreans claim to have felled trees and killed Japanese sea lions there for many decades.

There are serious pollution concerns in the seas surrounding the Liancourt Rocks. The sewage water treatment system established on the islets has malfunctioned, so sewage produced by inhabitants of the Liancourt Rocks, such as South Korean Coast Guards and lighthouse staff, is being dumped directly into the ocean. Significant water pollution has been observed; sea water has turned milky white, sea vegetation is progressively dying off, and calcification of coral reefs is spreading. The pollution is also causing loss of biodiversity in the surrounding seas. In November 2004, eight tons of malodorous sludge was being dumped into the ocean every day. Efforts have since been made by both public and private organizations to help curb the level of pollution surrounding the Rocks.

Construction
South Korea has carried out construction work on the Liancourt Rocks, by 2009 the islands had a lighthouse and helicopter pad, and a police barracks. In 2007, two desalination plants were built capable of producing 28 tons of clean water every day. Both of the major South Korean telecommunications companies have installed cellular telephone towers on the islets.

History

Whaling
U.S. and French whaleships cruised for right whales off the rocks between 1849 and 1892.

Demographics and economy

In February 2017, there were two civilian residents, two government officials, six lighthouse managers, and 40 members of the coast guard living on the islets. Since the South Korean coast guard was sent to the islets, civilian travel has been subject to South Korean government approval; they have stated that the reason for this is that the islet group is designated as a nature reserve.

In March 1965, Choi Jong-duk moved from the nearby Ulleungdo to the islets to make a living from fishing. He also helped install facilities from May 1968. In 1981, Choi Jong-duk changed his administrative address to the Liancourt Rocks, making himself the first person to officially live there. He died there in September 1987. His son-in-law, Cho Jun-ki, and his wife also resided there from 1985 until they moved out in 1992. Meanwhile, in 1991, Kim Sung-do and Kim Shin-yeol transferred to the islets as permanent residents, still continuing to live there. In October 2018, Kim Sung-do died, thus Kim Shin-yeol is the last civilian resident still living on the islands.

The South Korean government gave its approval to allow 1,597 visitors to visit the islets in 2004. Since March 2005, more tourists have received approval to visit. The South Korean government lets up to 70 tourists land at any given time; one ferry provides rides to the islets every day. Tour companies charge around 350,000 Korean won per person (about US$310 ).

Sovereignty dispute

Sovereignty over the islands has been an ongoing point of contention in Japan–South Korea relations. There are conflicting interpretations about the historical state of sovereignty over the islets.

South Korean claims are partly based on references to an island called Usan-do in various medieval historical records, maps, and encyclopedia such as Samguk Sagi, Annals of Joseon Dynasty, Dongguk Yeoji Seungnam, and Dongguk munhon bigo. According to the South Korean view, these refer to today's Liancourt Rocks. Japanese researchers of these documents have claimed the various references to Usan-do refer at different times to Jukdo, its neighboring island Ulleungdo, or a non-existent island between Ulleungdo and Korea. The first printed usage of the name Dokdo was in a Japanese log book in 1904.

Other key points of the dispute involve the legal basis that Japan used to claim the islands in 1905, and the legal basis of South Korea's claim on the islands in 1952.

North Korea and South Korea each agree that the islands are its territory and reject Japan's claim.

Natural Monument of South Korea 
The Liancourt Rocks were designated as a breeding ground for sea swallows, blackbirds, and black-tailed gulls as Natural Monument #336 of South Korea on November 29, 1982.

See also 

 Dokdo Volunteer Garrison
 Rusk documents

Notes

Inline citations

References

External links

South Korea
 Dokdo Official Website
 Dokdo Research Institute (Korea)
 The Ministry of Foreign Affairs of Korea

Japan
 "Takeshima Archives Potal" (Cabinet Secretariat, Japan)
 "Commissioned Research Report on Archives of Takeshima" Cabinet Secretariat, Japan
 "Takeshima" (Shimane prefectural office, Japan)
 Japanese Territory / "Takeshima" (MOFA, Japan)
 "10 Issues of Takeshima" Northeast Asia Division, Asian and Oceanian Affairs Bureau, MOFA, Japan (February 2008)
 "TAKESHIMA: 10 points to understand the Takeshima Dispute" Northeast Asia Division, Asian and Oceanian Affairs Bureau, MOFA, Japan (March 2014)
	

 

 
Anti-Japanese sentiment in Korea
Anti-Korean sentiment in Japan
Disputed islands
Disputed territories in Asia
Islands of the Sea of Japan
Japan–South Korea border
Territorial disputes of Japan
Territorial disputes of South Korea
Natural Monuments of South Korea
Islands of North Gyeongsang Province
Islands of Shimane Prefecture
Ulleung County